Reedurban is an unincorporated community and census-designated place (CDP) in Stark County, Ohio, United States. It was first listed as a CDP prior to the 2020 census.

The CDP is in central Stark County, on the west side of Canton. It is in northeastern Perry Township. Ohio State Route 172 (Tuscarawas Street) is the main road through Reedurban, leading east  to the center of Canton and west through Perry Heights  to Massillon.

Demographics

References 

Census-designated places in Stark County, Ohio
Census-designated places in Ohio